Playtex is an American brand name for undergarments, baby products, gloves, feminine hygiene products, and sunscreen. The brand began in 1947 when International Latex Corporation (ILC) created a division named Playtex to produce and sell latex products. Playtex was the first to advertise undergarments on national television in 1955, written by Howard Shavelson at Olgilvie and Mather, and the first to show a woman wearing only a bra from the waist-up in a commercial in 1977. They developed space suits for the Apollo program.

Playtex-branded tampons were introduced in the 1960s and became the primary competition to incumbent Tampax. Playtex invented the plastic tampon applicator in 1973. It was one of the tampon manufacturers that were sued for aggressively advertising over-absorbent tampons that led to toxic shock syndrome.

Playtex was acquired by Esmark in 1975, and then by Beatrice Foods in 1985. A year later, it was acquired for $1.25 billion, and its cosmetics brands were sold to Revlon. In 1988, Playtex split into Playtex Apparel Inc. and Playtex Products LLC. Playtex Apparel was sold to Sara Lee Corporation in 1991, and to Hanesbrands in 2007.

History

Early history
Abram Nathaniel Spanel founded the International Latex Corporation in Rochester, New York, in 1932 to produce latex products such as bathing caps, swimwear, and baby pants. ILC moved to Dover, Delaware, in 1939, making it the first large, non-agricultural business in the city.

ILC did not produce apparel for adults until the introduction of the Living Girdle in 1940, after patenting a method of manufacturing latex girdles that would not tear at the seams if they had a small tear or hole. The Living Girdle was advertised with images of mobility and comfort, such as women playing tennis or leaping while wearing it, though the solid rubber girdle was actually very uncomfortable.

During World War II, the bombing of Pearl Harbor and the Japanese invasion of Malaysia cut off Allied manufacturers from their largest sources of latex. Supplies ran out and demand fell for consumer products, so ILC halted production; sales did not resume until 1946. The company almost went out of business during the war, so it created an industrial division to find government and military applications for latex. Playtex was founded in 1947 as one of four divisions into which ILC re-organized. Its name was a portmanteau of "play" and "latex", reflecting its focus on latex products. Playtex's marketing in the post-war era was influential in creating the shift from custom-tailored undergarments to manufactured sizes. For example, the company introduced large floor displays with fitting charts so that women could find the right size without a custom fitting.

In 1954, ILC was sold to Stanley Warner Corporation for $15 million($ in modern dollars). The following year, it was the first to advertise under-garments on network television. In 1962, the industrial division of Playtex was awarded a contract to develop space suits for the Apollo mission to the moon, including a customized suit for Neil Armstrong. Playtex's industrial division was spun off in 1967, two years before the moon landing that utilized its space suits; it eventually became ILC Dover.

Playtex created the consumer products subsidiary Playtex Products Inc. in 1960 which produced baby products, tampons, and other consumer goods. It introduced and patented the first plastic tampon applicator in 1973. By 1975, the five largest tampon manufacturers began competing with multimillion-dollar advertising budgets, and Playtex became the primary competitor to market-leader Tampax. Playtex introduced a scented tampon that was advertised with the slogan, "When you're wearing a tampon you don't worry about odor. But should you?" Planned Parenthood complained, so a warning label was added saying that some women may experience irritation from the chemicals. Playtex and other tampon manufacturers were sued for aggressively advertising and competing over absorbency, when some studies found that excessive absorbency leads to toxic shock syndrome. In 1985, a judge offered to reduce an $11 million verdict against Playtex if they would recall their super-plus tampons and admit that they were killing women.

Joel Smilow era

Joel Smilow became chief executive officer (CEO) of Playtex in 1969 and was associated with the company through five owners. The company was acquired by Esmark in 1975 for $210 million ($ in modern dollars).

By the early 1980s, Playtex controlled 25 percent of the market for bras, giving it the largest market-share in the industry. In 1982, Playtex acquired the skin and hair products brand, Jhirmack Enterprises Inc., for $28.3 million ($ in 2018 dollars). Three years later Esmark sold Playtex to Beatrice Foods. Four years later an investor group led by Smilow bought Playtex for $1.25 billion ($ in modern dollars). To help fund the acquisition, the company's cosmetics brands, Max Factor, Almay and Halston, were sold to Revlon for $345 million ($ in modern dollars). 

The following year, the National Association of Broadcasters (NAB) relaxed rules regarding partial nudity on television, which previously forced undergarment manufacturers to use mannequins in their commercials, despite bathing suits and equally revealing swimwear being allowed. Playtex was the first to advertise with a live model wearing only a bra from the waist up. This attracted criticisms from members of the American Family Association and the Eagle Forum. The New York Times called the ads "totally inoffensive" and CBS's spokesman said they were "well done, tasteful and not exploitative."

Ownership of the remaining apparel and consumer products divisions were split among the company's leadership (28 percent), BCI Holdings (20 percent), Drexel Burnham (19 percent) and institutional investors (33 percent). The following year the company attempted to sell the Family Products division to Johnson and Johnson but the deal fell through.

In 1988, Playtex split into two companies, Playtex Apparel and Playtex Family Products, in a series of financial transactions totaling $1.3 billion. The transactions allowed Smilow to buy out other Playtex shareholders and put ownership of the brand into two separate investment groups that were owned by Smilow and other Playtex executives. In 1990 Playtex Products acquired cosmetics brand Maybelline for $300 million ($ in modern dollars). The next year Smilow sold Playtex Apparel to the Sara Lee Corporation, owner of the Bali and Hanes brands, for $571 million, ($ in modern dollars) but keeping the Playtex Family Products Corporation.

In November of that year, Sara Lee also bought a 25 percent stake in Playtex Family Products for $62.5 million ($ in modern dollars). Playtex Products Inc. went public in 1994. In 1995, another 40 percent of Playtex Products Inc. was sold to Haas Wheat & Harrison Investment Partners for $180 million ($ in modern dollars).

Recent history
Playtex Products continued to erode Tampax's market share throughout the late 20th century. The two companies had divided the market almost evenly by the late 1990s. Both makers increased profits primarily by reducing the tampon count per box, and prepared to enter emerging markets, particularly in Asia, where many women still used homemade pads. In 1997 Procter & Gamble (P&G), makers of Always sanitary napkins and pantiliners, bought Tambrands  for $1.25 billion, its largest acquisition up to that point, returning to the tampon sector almost two decades after pulling Rely from the market over Toxic Shock Syndrome concerns.

Due to its strong advantage among younger women, and baby boomers reaching menopause, Playtex continued to gain market share on Tampax. After extensive market research, Tampax reversed that trend with the 2002 introduction of Pearl, with an applicator designed to be as visually appealing as it was functional, and making the brand once again appealing to teens.

Playtex responded by litigating. In one suit, it alleged patent infringement over Pearl's applicator design. It also alleged that advertising claiming Tampax Pearl had better leakage protection and comfort than Gentle Glide was false. Playtex won a verdict prohibiting Tampax from making claims of superiority, until the decision was reversed in 2007, when Tampax made improvements in materials and manufacturing.

In 2006, Sara Lee spun off its clothing sector into HanesBrands Inc., which now runs the Playtex apparel business. The next year Playtex Products acquired the Hawaiian Tropic sunscreen company for $83 million. Later that year Playtex Products was acquired by Energizer Holdings for $1.16 billion. Playtex Products was sued in 2008, when a mother accused the company of not adequately disclosing their baby bottles contained bisphenol A. After Canada considered banning the chemical, the company took it out of their bottles the following year.

In 2013, the Playtex intimate apparel brand launched a $10 million integrated marketing campaign called "Be Uniquely You." This 360 rebranding included new bra styles and packaging and a strong presence in social media and national TV ads. The new campaign was created by KraftWorks NYC.

In 2015, Energizer Holdings spun out several businesses including Playtex Products into a new company called Edgewell Personal Care.

Organization
The Playtex trademark is owned by Playtex Marketing Corp. in the United States and Canada. They license the trademark to HBI Branded Apparel Enterprise (a subsidiary of Hanesbrands) for Playtex-branded apparel and Playtex Products Inc (a subsidiary of Energizer Holdings) for baby products, gloves and feminine products. Hanesbrands and Energizer Holdings each own a fifty percent interest in Playtex Marketing Corp. Hanesbrands also owns the rights to the brand name for use with apparel internationally, except in Europe and South Africa, where DBA Apparel (itself acquired by Hanes in 2014) sells Playtex-branded apparel products. Playtex Products LLC is managed under the Personal Care Division of Energizer Holdings.

Products
According to Energizer Holdings' 2012 annual report, Playtex Products LLC is the largest producer of household gloves, hand wipes and sunscreen, as well as the second largest producer of tampons in the US. The best-selling Playtex tampon is the Gentle Glide brand, which was first introduced in 1973. It also manufactures the Playtex Sport tampon, which targets young athletes. Both brands are sold in regular, super and super-plus absorbency. Playtex had a 29 percent share of a $550 million market for tampons in 1994 and a 30 percent share of a $780 million market by 2000.

Historically baby products were a small portion of Playtex Products' revenues, but by 2000 they made up 38 percent of the company's revenues. As of that year it had a 60 percent share of the market for "sippy cups" and an 84 percent share of the market for disposable baby-bottle liners. Other baby products include Chubs Baby Wipes, Baby Magic toiletries (until 2007), and Diaper Genie. Playtex Products also manufactures the Banana Boat and Hawaiian Tropic sunscreen brands, household gloves, diaper pails, cleansing cloths and the Ortho-Pro and Binky pacifiers.

Playtex-branded apparel products sold by Hanesbrands include bras, panties and shapewear. According to Hanesbrands, Playtex is the fourth largest brand by revenue in its portfolio. The brand has the strongest loyalty among customers who prioritize fit. As of 2002, Playtex was the second most popular brand of bras. In addition to panties and shapewear, Playtex bra brands include:
Cross Your Heart
Eighteen-hour bra
Playtex Secrets
Full support
Everyday basics

The company has been producing and marketing the Cross Your Heart bra since 1954 under the slogan that it "lifts and separates," a phrase that is now well known in popular culture. The Eighteen Hour bra has been marketed on the premise of comfort since the 1970s.

See also

References

External links 

 Playtex official site
 Playtex fits – bra campaign site
 HanesBrands Inc. 

1932 establishments in New York (state)
Clothing companies established in 1932
Companies based in Westport, Connecticut
Feminine hygiene brands
Lingerie brands
Manufacturing companies established in 1932
Products introduced in 1947
Hanesbrands
Edgewell Personal Care